Bangabandhu Sheikh Mujibur Rahman Tunnel (or Karnaphuli Tunnel) is an underwater expressway tunnel in the port city of Chittagong, Bangladesh under the Karnaphuli river. The tunnel diameter will be . The cost of the project is estimated at  US$1.1B, of which around half is financed by the Exim Bank of China. The tunnel is expected to be completed in 2022 and will be the first under-river road tunnel in South Asia. It is expected to improve the Dhaka—Chittagong—Cox's Bazar highway network. A Chinese company, China Communications Construction Company, was selected to construct it. Prime Minister Sheikh Hasina and Chinese Communist Party general secretary Xi Jinping inaugurated the construction site of the Karnaphuli Tunnel on 14 October 2017. On 24 February 2019, Sheikh Hasina also inaugurated the tunnel boring phase.

The tunnel segments were produced in Zhenjiang, China.

History 
On October 14, 2016, Bangladesh Prime Minister and Chinese President Xi Jinping laid the foundation stone of the project. Prime Minister Sheikh Hasina officially inaugurated the construction of the Bangabandhu Sheikh Mujibur Rahman Tunnel on February 24, 2019.

Financing 
The construction of the tunnel will cost 10 thousand 374 crores. In October 2016, during the visit of Chinese President Xi Jinping to Dhaka, the loan agreement for the construction of the Karnaphuli tunnel was signed. According to the agreement, Exim Bank of China is giving Tk 5 thousand 913 crore as a 20-year loan. The rest of the funding is being done by the Bangladesh government. Exim Bank's financing interest rate is 2 percent.

See also
 Dhaka-Chittagong Highway
 Chittagong port
 List of megaprojects in Bangladesh
 Sheikh Mujibur Rahman, namesake of the tunnel
 Belt and Road Initiative

References

Tunnels in Bangladesh
Karnaphuli River
Transport in Chittagong